Qışlaq or Kishlag or Kyshlak or Gishlagh or Ghshlagh may refer to:
Zhdanov, Lori, Armenia
Qışlaq Abbas, Azerbaijan
Qışlaq, Jabrayil, Azerbaijan
Qişlaq, Khojali, Azerbaijan
Qışlaq, Lachin, Azerbaijan
Qışlaq, Lerik (disambiguation), several places in Azerbaijan
Qışlaq, Aşağı Amburdərə, Azerbaijan
Qışlaq, Vıjaker, Azerbaijan
Qışlaq, Zərigümaco, Azerbaijan
Aşağı Qışlaq, Azerbaijan
Ruçuq, Azerbaijan
Şıxakəran, Azerbaijan
Utalgi, Azerbaijan 
Yuxarı Qışlaq, Azerbaijan
Xırt, Azerbaijan

See also
Qeshlaq (disambiguation)
Kışla